Mecha refers to scientific ideas or science-fiction genres that center on robots or machines controlled by people.

Mecha may also refer to:

Arts and entertainment
 Mecha anime and manga
 Mecha, a robot in Catalyst: Agents of Change comics

Places
 Mecha (selo), a rural locality in Osintsevskoye Rural Settlement, Kishertsky District, Perm Krai, Russia
 Mecha (woreda), a district of the Amhara Region, Ethiopia

Other uses
 MEChA (Movimiento Estudiantil Chicanx de Aztlán), a US-based student organization
 Mecha Ortiz (1900–1987), Argentine actress
 Mecha tea, a type of Japanese green tea

See also 
 
 
 Meca (disambiguation)
 Mecca (disambiguation)